Roxborough is a town in Trinidad and Tobago, Located at the southern shore of the Island of Tobago, it has a population of 2,089 (2011).

History
The settlement was named after the cocoa plantation Roxborough Estate.

See also 

List of cities and towns in Trinidad and Tobago

References

Populated places in Trinidad and Tobago
Tobago